Uroctea durandi is a Mediterranean spider about 16 mm in length, dark in color with five yellow spots on its back.

It lives under rocks, where it constructs an upside-down tent-like hanging web about 4 cm in diameter. From each of the six openings two signaling threads protrude. When an insect or millipede touches one of these threads, the spider lunges out of the respective opening and catches its prey.

References

Oecobiidae
Spiders of Europe
Spiders of Africa
Spiders described in 1809